Apiloscatopse bifilata  is a species of fly in the family Scatopsidae. It is found in the Palearctic.   
Described from specimens in Haliday's collection. The type locality is likely Ireland.

References

External links
 Images representing Scatopsidae at BOLD

Scatopsidae
Insects described in 1856
Nematoceran flies of Europe